Dawu County, also written Tawu County or Daofu County, is a county of northwestern Sichuan Province, China. It borders the counties of Xinlong to the west, Kangding and Yajiang to the south, and Jinchuan and Zamtang of Ngawa Prefecture as well as Luhuo to the north.

In January 1981 it was struck by an earthquake.

Climate

References

External links

See this link for a book-length study of a Tibetan village in Dawu County:
 http://tibetanplateau.wikischolars.columbia.edu/Volume+Fifteen--Rgyalrong+Tibetan+Village

Populated places in the Garzê Tibetan Autonomous Prefecture
County-level divisions of Sichuan